Mapletoft is a surname. Notable people with the surname include:

 Justin Mapletoft, ice hockey player
 Mark Mapletoft, rugby player
 Robert Mapletoft (1609–1677), Dean of Ely